Tim Glasby (born 27 April 1989) is a former Australian professional rugby league footballer. He played for the Melbourne Storm, with whom he won the 2017 NRL Grand Final and Newcastle Knights in the NRL. He also represented Queensland in State of Origin.

Early life
Glasby was born in Townsville, Queensland, Australia, but grew up in Rockhampton, Queensland and was educated at North Rockhampton State High School.

He played junior rugby league for local clubs, North Rockhampton Knights and Rockhampton Brothers. He was then signed by the Penrith Panthers.

Playing career

Early years
From 2008 to 2009, Glasby played for the Penrith Panthers' NYC team. He later joined the Central Queensland Capras in the Queensland Cup. In 2010, he won the Rookie of the Year award, while winning the Capras' Player of the Year three years in a row from 2010 to 2012. He captained the side in 2012. On 6 June 2012, he signed a 2-year contract with the Melbourne Storm starting in 2013.

2013
In round 16 of the 2013 NRL season, Glasby made his NRL debut for the Storm against the Wests Tigers. He went on to play one more NRL match for the Storm in his debut season.

2014
On 21 July, Glasby signed a two-year contract with North Queensland starting in 2015, however he was granted a release from the contract in October on compassionate grounds, re-signing with the Storm on a new two-year contract until the end of 2016. He played 13 NRL matches for the Storm in 2014, as he began to establish himself in the top side.

2016
In April, Glasby re-signed with the Melbourne club on a two-year contract until the end of 2018.
Glasby was part of the Melbourne side which convincingly won the 2016 Minor Premiership but lost the grand final to Cronulla-Sutherland at ANZ Stadium.

2017
After losing Game I of the 2017 State of Origin series, defeated 28-4 by New South Wales, the Queensland Maroons omitted players Corey Oates, Justin O'Neill, Nate Myles, Sam Thaiday, Aidan Guerra and Jacob Lillyman all due to form, opening up a position on the interchange bench for Glasby to make his State of Origin debut in Game II. This led to controversy after Sydney newspaper The Daily Telegraph published an article with the headline "Why did Queensland select this NRL nobody?". The article received backlash, being called "disrespectful" and in "poor taste".

In October, Glasby played off the interchange bench for the Storm in their 2017 NRL Grand Final win over the North Queensland Cowboys.

2018
In May, Glasby signed a three-year contract with the Newcastle Knights starting in 2019.
In the 2018 NRL season, Glasby played 24 games as Melbourne reached their third consecutive grand final but were defeated by the Sydney Roosters 21-6 at ANZ Stadium.  This was Glasby's last game for Melbourne.

2019
Glasby played 21 games for Newcastle in the 2019 NRL season as the club finished a disappointing 11th on the table.

2020
After playing 7 games for Newcastle in the 2020 NRL season, Glasby was unable to continue playing after recovering from repeated concussions and ongoing symptoms. In September, he was medically retired due to the on-going concussion issues. He said, "When I was playing Queensland Cup there was nothing... you would get a knock and you might tell someone afterwards, or you might have a beer and get on with it... I had no issues for a long time then I got a knock to the head and it started getting worse. That’s just my situation. I’ve erred on the side of caution this time and I hope by doing that I’ll limit any damage that may come long term."

Post career
In November 2020, it was announced that Glasby would be returning to the Melbourne Storm in 2021 as Recruitment Officer and Pathways Manager.

Honours
Club
 2016 Minor Premiership winners
 2017 NRL Grand Final Winners
 2017 Minor Premiership winners
 2018 World Club Challenge Winners

References

External links
Newcastle Knights profile
Melbourne Storm profile

1989 births
Living people
Australian rugby league players
Central Queensland Capras players
Eastern Suburbs Tigers players
Queensland Rugby League State of Origin players
Melbourne Storm players
Newcastle Knights players
Rugby league props
Rugby league locks
Rugby league players from Townsville